The Benjamin Franklin Academics Plus School is an historic elementary school which is located in the Crescentville neighborhood of Philadelphia, Pennsylvania. It is part of the School District of Philadelphia. 

The building was added to the National Register of Historic Places in 1988.

History and architectural features
The building was designed by Henry deCourcy Richards and was built in 1915. It is a two-story, five-bay, brick building tt was erected atop a raised basement in the Late Gothic Revival style. Additions were built in 1931 and 1954. It features entrances with carved stone and terra cotta surrounds and a brick parapet. The school was named for Benjamin Franklin.

The building was added to the National Register of Historic Places in 1988.

References

External links

School buildings on the National Register of Historic Places in Philadelphia
Gothic Revival architecture in Pennsylvania
School buildings completed in 1916
Northeast Philadelphia
Public K–8 schools in Philadelphia
School District of Philadelphia
1916 establishments in Pennsylvania